Wan Yunguo is a Chinese chess Grandmaster.

Chess career
He played in the Chess World Cup 2013, but was defeated by Michael Adams in the first round. He got a win against 9th seeded Baskaran Adhiban in the 9th Asian Continental. He was International Master in 2013 and Grandmaster in 2016.

References

External links 

Wan Yunguo chess games at 365Chess.com

Living people
Chinese chess players
Chess grandmasters
Year of birth missing (living people)